Lake Claiborne State Park is a recreation site located in Claiborne Parish, northwestern Louisiana, USA. The park provides access to scenic Lake Claiborne, a  man-made water body formed by damming Bayou D'Arbonne. Guests may stay at 10 cabins and 89 campsites (67 improved, 20 premium, 2 unimproved) on the Park grounds. Boats and canoes are available to rent. There is a large swimming beach, boat launch, Nature Center and numerous interpretive programs.

The park was designed by the late architect Hugh G. Parker, Jr., of Bastrop, Louisiana.

References

External links
Lake Claibone State Park - Louisiana Office of State Parks

Protected areas of Claiborne Parish, Louisiana
State parks of Louisiana